Tessaracoccus flavescens is a Gram-positive, anaerobic, non-spore-forming and non-motile bacterium from the genus Tessaracoccus which has been isolated from beach sediments from Jeju, Korea.

References 

Propionibacteriales
Bacteria described in 2008